The following list sorts countries and dependent territories by mean age at childbearing. The mean age at childbearing indicates the age of a woman at their childbearing events, if women were subject throughout their lives to the age-specific fertility rates observed in that given year. In countries with very high fertility rates women can have their first child at a much younger age than the mean age at childbearing.

List of countries (2021) 
Countries and dependent territories by the mean age at childbearing in 2021 according to the World Population Prospects 2022 of the United Nations Department of Economic and Social Affairs.

References

mean age at childbearing
mean age at childbearinge
Fertility